Katz index may refer to:

 Katz centrality in graph theory
 Katz Index of Independence in activities of daily living